The Beautiful & Damned is the fifth studio album by American rapper G-Eazy. It was released on December 15, 2017, by RCA Records. It features guest appearances from Halsey, Too Short, Cardi B, ASAP Rocky, Kehlani, E-40, Jay Ant, Nipsey Hussle, Charlie Puth and Slimmy B, among others. The album was preceded by three singles: "No Limit", "Him & I" and "Sober".

Background
The album's cover art and release was released on November 8, 2017. A short film accompanied its release date. The film was directed by Bobby Bruderle alongside G-Eazy, who co-wrote it and was released as an Apple Music exclusive. It was later revealed that G-Eazy paid for the film himself, costing around $700,000. In an interview with Angie Martinez, he revealed the album's concept.

Critical reception

The Beautiful & Damned received generally mixed reviews from music critics, with a score on Metacritc of 59/100. Neil Z. Young of AllMusic gave the album 4 out of 5 stars stating that, "With an inspired guest list and excellent production, The Beautiful & Damned is a satisfying artistic accomplishment that cautions as much as it seduces." HipHopDX concluded; "Established formulas of pandering singles and assembly line choruses aside, The Beautiful & Damned possesses enough serious assertiveness and classic Bay area slick talk to get burn well into 2018.", giving the album 3.9 out of 5 stars.

In a more mixed review, Sheldon Pearce of Pitchfork Media gave the album a 5.1 out of 10, and said that, "There are no insights to be found here about prestige, depression, or dependency. The whole thing is unbelievably dour and boring." Rachel Aroesti of The Guardian gave the album 2 out of 4 stars, and disapproved of the album's themes, stating in her conclusion, that, "His take on rap’s current go-to themes of drug dependency, joyless sex and the double-edged sword of success feels stale and smug."

In a negative review, Wren Graves of Consequence of Sound shared a similar sentiment, and gave the album a D+, stating "There’s no interruption, no welcome silence between discs one and discs two. No, just 20 songs, a brutal slog of stacks and condoms and stacks and condoms and occasionally a disembodied ass without any other parts of a woman sighted."

Commercial performance
The Beautiful & Damned debuted at number three on the US Billboard 200 with 122,000 album-equivalent units, of which 68,000 were pure album sales. It is G-Eazy's third US top 10 album. In its second week, the album dropped to number eight on the chart, earning an additional 50,000 album-equivalent units. In its third week, the album climbed to number four on the chart, selling 42,000 more album-equivalent units. In its fourth week, the album climbed to number three on the chart, selling 38,000 units, bringing its four-week total to 252,000 album-equivalent units. On January 31, 2019, the album was certified platinum by the Recording Industry Association of America (RIAA) for combined sales and album-equivalent units of over a million units in the United States.

Track listing
Credits adapted from Tidal.

Track notes
  signifies a co-producer
  signifies an additional producer
 "Pray for Me" features background vocals by Madison Love.
 "But a Dream" features background vocals by Devon Baldwin.
 "Leviathan" features background vocals by Michael Jade and Nicky Blitz.
 "No Less" is a remix of SG Lewis' song "No Less".
 "Love Is Gone" features background vocals by Leven Kali.
 "Charles Brown" contains uncredited interpolations of "Heard Em Say" by Kanye West.
 "Eazy" samples "Easy" by Son Lux.

Personnel
Credits adapted from Tidal.

Performers
 G-Eazy – primary artist
 Halsey – primary artist 
 SG Lewis – primary artist 
 Louis Mattrs – primary artist 
 Zoe Nash – featured artist 
 Charlie Puth – featured artist 
 ASAP Rocky – featured artist 
 Cardi B – featured artist 
 Anna of the North – featured artist 
 Sam Martin – featured artist 
 Kehlani – featured artist 
 E-40 – featured artist 
 Jay Ant – featured artist 
 Madison Love – featured artist 
 Ugochi – featured artist 
 Drew Love – featured artist 
 Son Lux – featured artist 

Technical
 Dakari – recording engineer 
 Jaycen Joshua – mixing engineer 
 David Nakaji – assistant mixing engineer 
 Ben Milchev – assistant mixing engineer 
 Serban Ghenea – mixing engineer 
 John Hanes – mixing engineer 
 Ivan Jimenez – assistant mixing engineer 
 Dave Kutch – mastering engineer 

Production
 Dakari – producer , additional producer 
 Boi-1da – producer 
 Cubeatz – producer 
 The Futuristics – producer 
 Dillon Francis – producer 
 OZ – producer , co-producer 
 Christoph Andersson – producer 
 Danno – producer 
 Boi-1da – producer 
 Allen Ritter – producer 
 J Gramm – producer 
 Michael Keenan – producer 
 Cardiak – producer 
 Hitmaka – co-producer 
 Rogét Chahayed – co-producer 
 Henry Daher – producer 
 Kuya Beats – producer 
 SG Lewis – producer 
 Swish – producer 
 FNZ – producer 
 G-Eazy – producer

Charts

Weekly charts

Year-end charts

Certifications

References

2017 albums
Albums produced by Boi-1da
Albums produced by Cubeatz
Albums produced by David Guetta
Albums produced by Dillon Francis
G-Eazy albums
RCA Records albums
Albums produced by Allen Ritter